David Cho may refer to:

 David Yonggi Cho (born 1936), Korean Christian minister
 David Cho (director) (born 1969), South Korean producer and director
 David Cho (journalist) (born 1970s), American journalist
 David Cho (Secret Service), former head of Joe Biden's security detail

See also
 David Choe, American graffiti artist